Klymaxx is an American all-female pop/R&B band from Los Angeles, California. The band's classic lineup consisted of Bernadette Cooper, Lorena Porter Shelby, Cheryl Cooley, Robbin Grider, Lynn Malsby, and Joyce "Fenderella" Irby. Klymaxx is best known for their 1984 international hit "I Miss You".

History
Klymaxx was created and formed in 1979 by Bernadette Cooper (producer/drummer/vocals); she also created the name klymaxx. The other original members included Lorena "Lungs" Porter Shelby (lead vocals), Cheryl Cooley (guitar), Robbin Grider (keyboards/guitar), and Lynn Malsby (keyboards). Joyce "Fenderella" Irby (bass/vocals/producer) joined the band later, before the recording of their debut album. Bernadette developed their core sound and continued becoming the band's figurehead. Their debut album Never Underestimate the Power of a Woman was released in 1981, and their second album was Girls Will Be Girls. 

However, their first album to achieve national recognition was 1984 released Meeting in the Ladies Room, featuring the top 5 US Billboard R&B chart successes "The Men All Pause", written by Bernadette Cooper and Irby, and the title track. The band's self-produced "I Miss You", penned by Lynn Malsby, became the band's pop breakthrough, peaking at #5 on the Hot 100. Lorena Lungs' vocals gave Klymaxx a clear distinctive sound, while Bernadette Cooper added the spoken word vibe and a musical direction that became their distinctive sound. Critics mentioned that Irby's voice was similar to Michael Jackson's, according to music historian Scot Brown.

The classic lineup disbanded in 1989, though several members regrouped sporadically as Klymaxx over the next five years to release further albums. Following the breakup there was a legal confrontation involving Cooley’s unauthorized use of the band's name and trademark, leading to the trademark decision Cheryl Cooley v. Bernadette Cooper and Joyce Irby. The ladies agreed to and also, per the Truth In Music Advertising Act, members are allowed to tour, as Klymaxx but must differentiate which version by adding their names.

Five of the six members from the classic Klymaxx lineup (with Robbin Grider being the one exception) met up together in a 2004 episode of VH1's Bands Reunited, for which they had been invited to perform. Cooley appeared, but due to the unresolved friction/tension with other band members, she was not allowed to perform during the group's concert.  Around this time, there was also an SNL episode featuring Halle Berry portraying Cooper. Klymaxx officially reformed shortly afterward, now billed as Klymaxx featuring Bernadette Cooper. Currently, individual members tour under Klymaxx featuring their namesake.

In 2009, all six members of the classic lineup participated in the group's episode of the TV One series Unsung.

On June 25, 2021, Klymaxx was inducted into the Women Songwriters Hall of Fame. All the members of Klymaxx accused the organization of honoring the touring lineup featuring Cheryl Cooley, whose contributions were minimal. Cooper, Malsby, and Joyce Irby noted that Cooley had edited the songwriting shares on ASCAP and Sony Music Publishing, by adding her name to the writing credits or taking sole credit in ASCAP's database. On the same day, Billboard magazine released a follow-up article bringing light to the fraudulent attempt uncovered by ASCAP and Sony ATV publishing.

Discography

Studio albums
 Never Underestimate the Power of a Woman (1981)
 Girls Will Be Girls (1982)
 Meeting in the Ladies Room (1984)
 Klymaxx (1986)
 The Maxx Is Back (1990)
 One Day (1994)

References

External links
 
 Official Website

All-female bands
African-American girl groups
American dance girl groups
American dance music groups
American funk musical groups
American soul musical groups
SOLAR Records artists
Musical groups established in 1979
Musical groups disestablished in 1994
Musical groups reestablished in 2003
Musical groups disestablished in 2013